GMR Junior College is a college located at Gajwel, Telangana, India. It was established in 1997.

See also 
Education in India
Literacy in India
List of institutions of higher education in Telangana

References

External links

Schools in Telangana
Medak district
Educational institutions established in 1997
1997 establishments in Andhra Pradesh